The Tampa–Hillsborough County Public Library System (THPL) is a public library system based in Hillsborough County, Florida. THPL is part of two larger library networks, the Tampa Bay Library Consortium, and the Hillsborough County Public Library Cooperative which includes Temple Terrace Public Library in Temple Terrace, Florida, and Bruton Memorial Library in Plant City, Florida. There are 33 branches of the HillsboroughCounty Public Library Cooperative, including one mobile book can. Services provided by the THPL include (but are in no way limited to) internet access, public meeting room spaces, interlibrary loans, a Bookmobile, a Cybermobile for Spanish speakers, technology classes, adult literacy programs, and downloadable eBooks. Drive-thru windows for returns and hold pick-ups are located at the Jimmie B. Keel and the Jan Kaminis Platt Regional Libraries. In 2017, THPL introduced the new HAAL Pass, which gives access to certain library resources to all students in the Hillsborough County Public Schools System. Students use their student ID number to use different online databases, borrow up to three physical items and read eBooks. The Tampa–Hillsborough County Public Library System is also a part of Hillsborough County government.
On January 1, 2018, the library cooperative became one of the largest in the country to go fine free. Overdue fees for borrowed materials were eliminated with the implementation of the "Just Bring It Back" initiative.
In 2019 the cooperative received the FLA Library of the Year Award. Tampa-Hillsborough County Public Library was recognized for its community focused initiatives when it "reorganized its staffing model and eliminated overdue fines, yielding $1 million in savings while increasing access to library resources and expanding opportunities for community engagement through unique, scalable programs.

History 
The Old Tampa Free Public Library was one of the first of only ten public libraries in Florida to receive a grant from Andrew Carnegie in order to construct and establish public community libraries. During the beginning of the 20th century, the society editor of the Tampa Tribune, Louise Frances Dodge, initiated the grab for the Carnegie funding for a library in Tampa in 1905. After much debate regarding Carnegie's "tainted money", Tampa was awarded with a $25,000 grant in 1912. In 1913, it was increased to $50,000.

That same year, the city of West Tampa also expressed interest in establishing a public library and was awarded a separate Carnegie grant of $17,500. After another lengthy debate about location, the Old Tampa Free Public Library (also known as the Exceptional Children Education Center) was erected at 102 E. Seventh Avenue and completed June 30, 1915. However, due to the refusal of Tampa's city council to fund the new library, it was not immediately available to the public. Eventually they allocated $10,000 per year to the library and it opened April 27, 1917, with only 3,800 books, donated by Mr. and Mrs. L. H. Lothridge. The building at 102 E. Seventh Avenue served as Tampa's main library building from the day it opened until 1968. It is now home to the City of Tampa's Community Affairs Department. West Tampa opened their library at 1718 North Howard Avenue. The main entrance is now located at 2312 West Union Street.

By 1925, Tampa's public library network had four branches. The City of Tampa annexed West Tampa that year and absorbed their library, the West Tampa Free Public Library (previously a stand-alone entity), into the library system. As Hillsborough county continued to grow throughout the 20th century, the need for libraries further and further away increased. In 1961, the City of Tampa and Hillsborough County contractually consolidated their libraries and (with the exception of Temple Terrace and Bruton Memorial, which remain separate agencies) the Tampa–Hillsborough County Public Library System was born. On September 1, 1999, the Hillsborough County Public Library Cooperative (HCPLC) was first introduced as a way for patrons to access materials and programs from other libraries in the library system. The library system currently circulates 3.5 million physical items and 2.3 million virtual items annually. A 2013 study done by the Florida Department of State's Division of Library and Information Services determined that Florida libraries return $10.18 in value to the community for every dollar it spends.

Prior to the 1984 fiscal year, control of the Tampa-Hillsborough County Public Library system was a contentious split between the County and the City of Tampa. In 1981 a controversy arose surrounding sex education books that were housed in the children's section. The City Council, not the County, decided the solution was to move the books to the adult section. This instance led to the creation of a committee to devise a plan to clearly define which entity, City or County, would have control of the libraries. Two plans came about, one proposed by the City Council that "recommended the creation of a seven member council under control of the mayor". The other recommendation was from the County Commission which called for a "14-member library board of directors with eight members appointed by the County Commission and six members appointed by the city. Neither plan was adopted as arguments from each side led to an impasse; some of the strongest objections against full County control came from Mayor Martinez who stated that such an idea was "unacceptable to the citizens of Tampa who have invested millions of dollars over many years to develop the system. The County had no library system, the city did." Although, 56 percent of the funding for the libraries budget was provided by the County Commission and 44 percent by the City Council.

Finally, on October 1, 1984, Florida House Bill Number 1022 was adopted. This bill officially enlarged the County library system to include the City of Tampa and created the Public Library Board, and provided funding for the system. Section 4 of House Bill 1022 designated that the Public Library Board will be composed of "twelve residents of Hillsborough County, three from each of the four county single-member districts appointed by the Board of County Commissioners of Hillsborough County for staggered terms of three years; and they shall serve at the pleasure of the County Commission. A majority of the membership of the Public Library Board shall constitute a quorum. This Board may make and adopt such by-laws, rules and regulations for its own guidance and for the government of the Public Library System as it may deem expedient and not inconsistent with law."

Directors 
There have been a total of seven directors of the Tampa–Hillsborough County Public Library System since it was founded in 1917. Most recently, Andrew S. Breidenbaugh was named director in February 2015.
 Andrew S. Breidenbaugh (2015–present)
 Joe Stines (1991–2015)
 John M. Adams (1983–1991)
 Leo H. Melrose Sr. (1972–1982)
 Cecil P. Beach (1965–1972)
 William S. Frieze (1947–1965)
 Helen V. Stelle (1917–1947)

Special collections 
The Hillsborough County Public Library System possesses many collections unique to the cultural heritage of Tampa Bay. The Burgert Brothers Photographic Collection shows the expansion of Florida from the late 1800s to the early 1960s, specifically social and residential growth during that time period. The images highlight the unique parts of Tampa, from the sponge fisherman and cigar cities to the strawberry farms and tourists. The physical collection is located at the John F. Germany branch, but the images are available online.

Along with the Burgert Brothers Photographic Collection, the library system also possesses the Hillsborough Remembers Oral Collection, which strives to foster communication between generations in the Tampa Bay community.

In honor of the library's 100th anniversary, special digital collections were made available to the public in 2014. These collections include the Burgert Brothers Photographic Collection, Library History Collection, Tampa–Hillsborough County Public Library Art and Artifact Collection, and the History & Genealogy Records of Hillsborough County.

Additionally, the Port Tampa City Library houses the library's Maritime Reading Room, a collection of books, maps, and maritime artifacts. It includes memorabilia and paintings that are on display as well as material that can be checked out by library patrons.

The Hive 
The Hive is a makerspace which offers a variety of services to the patrons of the Tampa-Hillsborough library system. You need a library card from Hillsborough county to make use of the services. Services for The Hive can be found at John F. Germany Public Library, Bloomingdale Regional Public Library, Jan Kaminis Platt Regional Library, Jimmie B. Keel Regional Library, New Tampa Regional Library, Seminole Heights Branch Library, SouthShore Regional Library, Town 'N Country Regional Public Library, Upper Tampa Bay Regional Public Library.

Cybermobile 
Cybermobile is a bus offering Spanish Library materials available for use, access to the Internet, and other library programs. The Cybermobile of the Tampa–Hillsborough County Public Library System was dedicated on May 11, 2006.

Library2Go 
Library2Go (formerly The Bookmobile) is a part of the Hillsborough County Public Library Cooperative. Library2Go provides library services to residents who may not be able to visit a library branch. The mobile program provides a variety of services, including library card registration, placing holds on library material, picking up requested materials, checkout from a selection of material formats, returning items, and accessing computers and the internet. Library2Go makes stops at 33 different locations across the Tampa area on Mondays-Thursdays.

Friends of the Library 
The Friends of the Library of Tampa-Hillsborough County Inc, is a nonprofit organization incorporated under the 501(c), whose goal is to support the 25 different libraries throughout Hillsborough County's diverse communities. The organization is composed of over 1,000 volunteers in twenty-one different chapters.

The mission statement of the organization is to strengthen, support and advocate for superior free public libraries in Tampa-Hillsborough County. The vision statement is to connect library users to their community and to the world and ensure that all residents have the freedom to read, watch, listen, play, learn, and discover at Tampa-Hillsborough Public Libraries.

The Friends of the Library began in 1967 when a group of individuals came with a vision to support public libraries in this community. The individual friends groups came together under one organizational umbrella, with the last group joining in December 2011.

The Friends of the Library work to raise money for programming and services at each of the public Libraries. One of the ways the organization fundraisers is by membership dues. Individuals can pledge their support to the Friends of the Library by contributing a yearly due. These can start at $35 to be a Library Council Member and can go up to $500 to be a Library Council Patron. The top contribution is $1,000 to become a Library Lifetime Member and this is the only option that does not renew yearly. Another way the Friends of the Library raises funds is by hosting different book sales at the different branches. Several of the library branches has a used book store, hosted by the organization, in which donated books are sold a discount price. All proceeds go straight back to the Friends of the Library to support library programs. Several times of the year, the Friends of the Library will host large one day only book sales to bring out community partners and members and increase the engagement of all those involved.

Events and programs 
One way that the Tampa-Hillsborough Public Libraries supports and engages the community is to host special programs, events, and classes to meet the needs of the individuals. Each branch houses its calendar of events for children, teenagers, and adults.

Throughout Hillsborough County, there are events held to involve the community in the libraries. Some events are baby time, storytime. Crochet, tech help, puzzle zone, and children’s theater. All of these events can be found on their website calendar.  Baby time is when you can bond with your baby through books, bouncy rhymes, and songs in this lap-sit program that introduces early literacy skills and encourages language development. For children ages 0‐18 months and their parents.  A program capacity of 10 children and 1 parent is in place. Storytime is Enjoy books, rhymes, songs, and activities. This engaging program offers social interaction and builds reading skills. For children ages 3 – 6 years and their parents. A program capacity of 20 children and one parent is in place. Crochet buddies are where youth come to learn the basics of crochet with Ms. Bonita. For ages nine and up. Tech help is where you can bring technology questions to the library. Library staff can help you troubleshoot computers and other technology, explore apps and devices, use eReaders, find eBooks, and navigate the HCPLC website and digital resources. The puzzle zone is where the library puts out puzzles that the whole family can come work on together. Lastly, Children’s theater is where the library chooses a play for the kids to work on. The children come and audition for parts, and then if they receive a part, they come to the practices and the show. 

One of the more unique programs the Hillsborough County Public Library Cooperative offers its patrons is its Ukulele Kits. Donated by the Tampa Bay Ukulele Society, the library checks out these 20 instruments to patrons so they can learn to play the instrument for free.

The Tampa-Hillsborough Public Library also will hold special programs for different parts of the year. The most recent example is the 2018 Summer Libraries Rock. This program had events for children and adults with a rock theme to keep the community members engaged during the summer. It also included reading lists for different age groups and a reading challenge hosted by the Tampa Rays.

Historical libraries in Tampa

Harlem Branch Library 
The Harlem Public Library was one of two libraries in Hillsborough county open to black patrons prior to desegregation. It opened in 1919 inside the Harlem Academy. It was originally established by the Paul Laurence Dunbar Literary Society, an organization of postal workers dedicated to promoting literary discussion and encouraging scholarship. In the early 1920s it was housed in the same building as the Urban League, and relocated to its final home at 1404 Central Ave. in 1927 until 1969. In 1927 it was reported that the branch owned about 3,500 items, the majority of which were juvenile volumes, and that circulation was 300-350 items per week. The branch's librarian from 1936 to 1961 was Ada T. Payne, Tampa's first black librarian.

Other historical libraries 
7th Avenue Branch, Tampa Free Library
Clair-Mel Library Station
Citrus Park Branch Library
East Branch Library
East Gate Branch Library
Eastlake Branch Library
Hillsborough County Science Library at MOSI
Hyde Park Branch Library
Northwest Regional Library
West Branch Library

Branches

78th Street Community Library 

The 78th Street Community Library is part of the Tampa–Hillsborough County Public Library System (THPL) and the Hillsborough County Public Library Cooperative (HCPLC). The library is an 8,000 sq. ft. facility located at 7625 Palm River Rd. in Tampa, Florida. The library provides books, magazines, music CDs and DVDs as well as programs and computer training classes.

Services 
Internet Access
Free Wireless (WiFi)
Community Meeting Room
Public Study Rooms
Free Scanning

Public art 
The library's interior contains a special public art piece titled The Knowledge Path, which was donated by the residents of Clair-Mel, Palm River, and Progress Village communities. The residents believed that "path" where the books are joined, connects the community.

Charles J. Fendig Public Library 

The Charles J. Fendig Public Library, is a public library in the Tampa–Hillsborough County Public Library System located in South Tampa, Florida. The library is a 12,000 square foot, single story brick building.

History 
The Charles J. Fendig Public Library was dedicated on November 1, 1960, and was initially known as the  Peninsular Branch Library.  The Peninsular Branch Library originally opened in a rented storefront located at 3837 Neptune St. in Tampa. In 1968, the library moved to its present location at 3909 Neptune St. On December 8, 1968, the library was dedicated by then mayor, Dick Greco, Jr. The building was renovated in 1994. The name was changed in 2001 to honor a former chairman of the Tampa Library Board.

Services 
In addition to books, magazines, DVDs, music CDs, and audiobooks, the library also offers meeting rooms, public use internet computers, access to electronic databases & eBooks, and a used book store. As with all libraries in the Tampa-Hillsborough County Public Library system, the Charles J. Fendig Public Library also offers printers, photocopiers, scanners, public fax service, free wi-fi, and assistive technology.

Friends of the Library 
Like all Hillsborough County Public Libraries, The Charles J. Fendig Library is served by a volunteer Friends of the Library group, bearing the name of the library. Proceeds from book sales are used to fund programs for children, teens and adults and to support other library activities.

Town 'N Country Regional Public Library 

The Town 'N Country Regional Public Library is one of the libraries within the Hillsborough County Public Library Cooperative and is located in West Tampa. It is open seven days a week.

History 
The Town 'N Country Regional Public Library opened in 1969 as the West Gate Branch Library in a storefront at the West Gate Shopping Center. In 1975, the library moved to its location on Paula Drive and became the test site for the library's first automated circulation system. The West Gate Branch became a regional branch in 1995. The West Gate Branch was the focus of national attention after the banning of a gay pride display in 2005. After 32 years of operation, the Paula Drive location was closed for construction in lieu of the Town 'N Country Commons. In May 2007, the Hillsborough County Board of County Commissioners approved a new name for the current library—"Town 'N Country Regional Public Library". The new library became part of the Town 'N Country Commons along with a Head Start center and a Senior Center next to the Shimberg Gardens.

Services 
In addition to all of the resources and services all branches offer, The Town 'N Country Regional Public Library also has a number of assistive technology available, such as JAWS, Open Book, Dragon Speak, ZoomText, Keys-U-See, and TOPAZ.
The branch is also one of four passport services locations. Applicants can schedule an appointment over the phone to apply for a new passport at the branch.

Friends of the Library
This branch houses the Friends of the Library Bargain Street Bookstore. This store is entirely run by volunteers selling donated books at a very small price and is open Mondays through Saturdays from 10 a.m. to 4 p.m. All children's books are 25¢. Most fiction books are 50¢ to $1. There are even high quality books that are currently popular at special prices.

Austin Davis Public Library 

The Austin Davis Public Library is a public library on the north side of Keystone Park in Odessa, Florida. The library is  part of the Tampa–Hillsborough County Public Library System. The library is the repository of community information from the Keystone Civic Association and maintains back issues of the Keystone Community Newsletter. It has a reading room, children's area, quiet area, electronic media area, meeting room and kitchen, and a cooking oil recycling station.

Initially known as the "Citrus Park-Keystone Library" when it opened in 1977, the Austin Davis Public Library provides service to the community of Citrus Park-Keystone-Odessa. It was a small 800-square-foot facility located in a storefront at Fox's Corner Shopping Center. In 1986 the library doubled its size to 1,600 square feet and expanded into a second storefront.

In 1991 Mr. Austin Davis and the Austin Davis Family/Winn-Dixie Charities, Inc. offered $1.1 million to build a new library for this community. In May 1993, the new library opened with 10,500 square feet and almost 30,000 volumes.

Egypt Lake Partnership Library 
The Egypt Lake Partnership Library is part of the Tampa–Hillsborough County Public Library System. The Egypt Lake Partnership Library is located at 3403 W. Lambright St. in Tampa, Florida. The Egypt Lake Partnership Library was formed by a partnership between the Tampa- Hillsborough County Public Library System and the School District of Hillsborough County. The library is currently open 6 days a week. The library opens at 2:30 pm Monday-Friday to accommodate for the school day.

Florida History & Genealogy Library 
The Florida History & Genealogy Library is located on the fourth floor of the John F. Germany Public Library, which is the flagship branch of the Tampa-Hillsborough County Public Library system. This special collection houses one of the most sizable genealogy collections in the southeastern United States and records are available in print, microfilm, and electronic formats. The main emphasis of the collection is on Florida history but also includes material related to the southeastern United States and original thirteen American colonies. Record groups include vital statistics and other indexes related to marriages, death, and cemetery records for Florida counties. Additional collections include those related to the military, passenger ships, pensions, and court records. A Tampa-Hillsborough County Public Library card is not required to access the collection and materials are only accessible during normal library hours. Items in the collection do not circulate and are restricted to in-library access. Materials cannot be transferred via Interlibrary Loan.

Jimmie B. Keel Regional Library 
The Jimmie B. Keel Regional Library was formerly the Northwest Regional Library.

In December 1986, Northwest Regional Library opened at 15610 Premiere Drive. The Jimmie B. Keel Regional Library, a gift from the Winn-Dixie Foundation, replaced the old Northwest Regional Library building on Premiere Drive. The branch is named in honor of Jimmie B. Keel, former Assistant County Administrator, in recognition of his 35 years of passionate, caring service to Hillsborough County.

The Jimmie B. Keel Regional Library opened February 14, 2001, to serve the Carrollwood and Northdale communities in northern Hillsborough County. A 10,000 square foot expansion of the original 25,000 square foot building was completed in February 2014 and features: a glass-enclosed children's room and story time room, a second community room over twice the size of the original, new spaces, furniture and technologies to facilitate collaborative work, a vending café, a larger Carousel Book Store, Adobe Creative Cloud software, assistive technology, a cooking oil recycling station, and electric car charging stations.

Open seven days a week, the library houses a comprehensive circulating collection in multiple formats and a wide variety of programs and services. In addition to the two large community rooms and story time room, four smaller meeting rooms are available for programs, meetings, quiet study and literacy tutoring. A public makerspace, The Hive, offers unique tools, activities and events for hands-on learning. A drive-thru window offers convenient checkout and return of library materials to customers on the go.

The Friends of the Jimmie B. Keel Regional Library are active partners who operate the Carousel Bookstore located in the north lobby of the library. They use funds raised by bookstore sales to pay for library programs for adults, teens and children as well as the purchase of furniture, fixtures, technology and art to enhance the facility, including the seven life-sized carousel animals by local artist Cindy Niemi Seifert installed in the children's room.

The Jimmie B. Keel Regional Library is enriched by art acquired through Hillsborough County's Public Art Program including 17 paintings by local folk artist Mr. B (Jack Beverland) which illustrate The Song of Hillsborough written by Hillsborough County's Poet Laureate James E. Tokley, Sr; the screen print Two Butterflies by Carolyn Heller, local artist and founding member of the County's Public Art Committee; the oil and acrylic More Toys More Fun More TV - Red Wagon by James Michaels; the oil on photograph Shadow Play #2 by Richard Reddig; a digital print of Visions for Tomorrow by Bruce Marsh; and an untitled hand colored photograph by Lorraine Genovar. Additionally, two sculptural works, Manatee Porthole and Dolphin Smile Porthole, by noted artist Wyland were generously donated to the library by the Carrollwood Area Business Association (CABA).

The Library is also home to Gallery @ 2902 where the works of local and regional artists are regularly exhibited.

Norma and Joseph Robinson Partnership Library at Sulphur Springs 
The Norma and Joseph Robinson Partnership Library at Sulphur Springs is part of the Hillsborough Country Public Library Cooperative. The Norma and Joseph Robinson Partnership Library is located at 8412 N 13th St. in Tampa, Florida. This library was funded through a collaboration between the Hillsborough County Board of County Commissioners and the Hillsborough County Public Schools. This project allowed for the media center at Sulphur Springs Elementary School to be expanded by 3,500 square feet. The creation of this library branch has brought more literacy opportunities to the community surrounding the school.

North Tampa Branch Library 
The North Tampa Branch Library is located at 8916 North Blvd. in Tampa, Florida. The building underwent a complete renovation but reopened at the same site on September 18, 2009. The location originally opened on January 13, 1964, and measured 3500 square feet. Expansions took place in 1967, to 7,000 square feet, and in 1977, to 10,500 square feet. Currently, the building is 24,000 square feet and includes a teen room, children's room, computer lab, meeting rooms, and a quiet study room. The library hosts programs for teenagers and provides involvement opportunities through the Teen Advisory Board, allowing for engagement with students from the neighboring Chamberlain High School. Additional programming is available for children and adults, such as technology classes and the Master Gardner series. Solar panels were installed in April 2020 and megawatt hour generation on a monthly, yearly, and lifetime scale can be tracked on the library's website. As part of the county library art program, the North Tampa Library's children's room showcases Lisa and Joe Vogt's Reach for the Stars stained glass piece, which was donated by the artists.

Port Tampa City Library 
The Port Tampa City Library is located at 4902 W Commerce St, Tampa, FL 33616 and is open to the public Monday-Saturday. The library offers public computers, printing, copying, scanning, and faxing services, as well as free WiFi. There are meeting and study spaces available for reservation, among them the Maritime Reading Room, a space dedicated to books, art, and artifacts relating to sailing and the sea.

History 

The library was originally located across the street at 8611 Interbay Blvd and was created and maintained by the Port Tampa City Women’s Club volunteers from 1951-1961, at which point it was encompassed by the Tampa Library System. When the Hillsborough County libraries merged with the Tampa Library System in 1984, Port Tampa City Library became a member of the Hillsborough County Public Library Cooperative (HCPLC). 

The building it currently resides in was built in 1926 by James G. Yeats and was intended to be a bank. After operating for only seven years, the bank shut down in 1933, and Yeats passed away that same year (today, James G. Yeats is remembered in the “Yeats Room”, the large community room where programs and classes take place).

The building became the site of many enterprises after that – including a grocery store, an aviation school, a boutique, and even a hospital – until eventually sitting unoccupied for over a decade and being slated for demolition. Before the demolition could occur, the Port Tampa City Women’s Club proposed restoring the structure and moving the library into it, as the original library was suffering from cramped quarters and maintenance issues. The idea was proposed in 1993 and came to fruition in 1998. In a ceremonial “passage of the book”, the community came together to form a human chain linking the old library to the new. The very last book to be moved, “A History of the City of Port Tampa 1888-1961”, was passed from person to person until reaching the new structure.  The old structure was demolished in 2006.

SouthShore Regional Library 
The SouthShore Regional Library is part of the Tampa–Hillsborough County Public Library System (THPL) and the largest branch of the Hillsborough County Public Library Cooperative (HCPLC). Opened in October 2006, this 40,000 square foot facility is located at 15816 Beth Shields Way in Ruskin, Florida and serves the surrounding Ruskin, Sun City, Wimauma, and Apollo Beach south county communities.   The library's collection consists of both fiction and non-fiction materials, DVDs, audio books, compact discs, newspapers, magazines, local author titles, and Spanish language materials. Additionally, the library features an expansive, non-circulating genealogy collection, which is housed in a separate room alongside other relevant genealogical resources. All libraries belonging to HCPLC share their collections, which also includes access to digital materials and resources. Unique lendable materials include ukuleles and Launchpad learning tablets.

The SouthShore Regional Library offers patrons a variety of services including regular adult, teen, and youth programming, study and meeting rooms, art studio and displays, bookable recording studio, makerspace, cooking oil recycling station, as well as access to computers, printers, copiers, assistive technology, and fax machine services. Wireless Internet is also available and password-free throughout the building.

The library's recording studio, also known as The HIVE, provides users with tools and software for creating, editing, and publishing audio and video projects. Currently available hardware and software include: iMacs, Adobe Creative Cloud, video cameras, microphones, USB audio interface, headphones, green screens, studio lighting, and necessary cables and attachments. SouthShore Library's newly added makerspace, which opened in 2019 as an expansion to The HIVE, provides the surrounding community with access to 3D printing, sewing machines, pop up programming kits, and various arts and crafts tools.

The library is open 7 days a week. A cafe with vending machines and Friends of the Library bookstore are also open according to library hours.

Robert W. Saunders, Sr. Public Library 
The Robert W. Saunders Sr. Public Library, located on 1505 N. Nebraska Ave. Tampa, Florida was originally opened in 1933 and was named the Ybor City Branch Library. It was donated by the local Italian American Club. The new building at 1505 North Nebraska Avenue was dedicated in January of 1969. On November 5, 2003, was renamed Robert W. Saunders, Sr. Public Library To honor the civil rights activist and former NAACP Field Director. The library houses the African American History & Genealogy Library including the Hall of History that contains an interactive exhibit that highlights the Central Avenue business district. Its collection includes the only African American focused genealogy resource in the Tampa-Hillsborough County Public Library System where patrons can find a circulating library of African American life, history, culture, authentic African art, encyclopedias, atlases, local history binders, newspaper clippings, and more. The archives room features rare books, microfilm and historical memorabilia.

Temple Terrace Public Library 
The Temple Terrace Public Library is located at 202 Bullard Parkway in the City of Temple Terrace and is part of the Hillsborough County Public Library Cooperative (HCPLC).

History 
The Temple Terrace Library was established in 1959 by the Temple Terrace Women's Club. The doors officially opened on January 15, 1960, after pursuing a collection of enough donations to facilitate a small library for the community. It was originally run by volunteers of the Women's Club and was located in a small house. As demand grew, they relocated to a City Hall building in April of 1961, which is now part of Florida College. The library shortly outgrew this too as they built their collection and by 1965 they needed a new building and a larger overall operation which included appointing a Library Board which was run by the city. They broke ground in September of that year and opened in April of 1966. The Women's Club remained involved and provided the money for the library's service desk. By the mid-70's they were running out of space and added 5,600 square feet which enlarged the structure by April 1978. On February 18, 1982, tragedy ensued when a fire was set by an arsonist. The library lost a devastating 11,666 books and 1,010 recordings. The Women's Club stepped in again and helped restore the building which then opened a year after the fire. In the meantime they relocated materials to the Lightfoot Recreation Center to keep the library going. In 1997 the library was once again renovated for expansion which brought the library to 20,000 square feet. It reopened in March 1998 with an online catalog, computers, and internet access which is largely how it is utilized to this day with a collection of over 100,000 volumes and 52 community computers.

Services 
Services include standard book, eBook, CD, and DVD checkout. There is access to computers, Wi-Fi, and other technologies as well as regular and 3D printing. There are  meeting and study rooms, safe areas for children, and a Book Nook provided by the local Friends of the Temple Terrace Library organization. There are programs for children, teens, and adults which include activities and resources for certain age groups and developmental levels ranging from story time to crafts and appropriate games. The library also offers many resources beyond books such as sewing machines, cooking items, tools, board games, and neck ties to borrow for various reasons. You can even "check out" a limited number of seed packets each month that do not have to be returned and come with instructions on how to take care of them. These are all resources that have been proven to be successful in the local community to help provide items that may only occasionally be needed. Partnering up with the University of South Florida Special & Digital Collections and Tampa-Hillsborough County Libraries, the Temple Terrace Library has also been able to provide access to archives of the local newspapers, the Temple Terrace Beacon and Temple Terrace Sentinel.

Other 
Arthenia L. Joyner University Area Community Library
Bloomingdale Regional Public Library
Brandon Regional Library
Bruton Memorial Library
C. Blythe Andrews, Jr. Public Library
 Florida History & Genealogy Library
James J. Lunsford Law Library
Jan Kaminis Platt Regional Library
John F. Germany Public Library
Lutz Branch Library
Maureen B. Gauzza Public Library
New Tampa Regional Library
North Tampa Branch Library
 Planning Commission Library
Riverview Public Library
Robert W. Saunders, Sr. Public Library
Ruskin Branch Library
Seffner-Mango Branch Library
Seminole Heights Branch Library
Temple Terrace Public Library
Thonotosassa Branch Library
West Tampa Branch Library
 Witt Research Center

References

External links 

HCPLC Locations

Library
County library systems in Florida
Public libraries in Florida